Charles M. Hambright (July 7, 1845 – October 5, 1938) was an American businessman and politician.

Born in the town of Rochester, Racine County, Wisconsin Territory, Hambright lived in Dodge County, Wisconsin from 1849 to 1867 and then for three years in the 1870s. During that time, Hambright served in the Union Army during the American Civil War. In 1876 and 1877, Hambright served on the Beaver Dam, Wisconsin common council. Hambright worked for Racine Woolen Mills. In 1895, Hambright served in the Wisconsin State Assembly from Racine, Wisconsin and was a Republican. Hambright died at the soldiers home in Milwaukee, Wisconsin.

References

1845 births
1938 deaths
Politicians from Beaver Dam, Wisconsin
People from Rochester, Wisconsin
People of Wisconsin in the American Civil War
Businesspeople from Wisconsin
Wisconsin city council members
Members of the Wisconsin State Assembly